"Du lundi au lundi" is a song by Niska released as a single in 2019. It reached number five on the SNEP singles chart in France and was later certified Platinum.

Charts

Certifications

References

2019 songs
2019 singles
Niska (rapper) songs
French-language songs